Count Mihály Ádám György Miklós Károlyi de Nagykároly (archaically English: Michael Adam George Nicholas Károlyi, or in short simple form: Michael Károlyi; 4 March 1875 – 19 March 1955) was a Hungarian politician who served as a leader of the short-lived and unrecognized First Hungarian Republic from 1918 to 1919. He served as prime minister between 1 and 16 November 1918 and as president between 16 November 1918 and 21 March 1919.

Early life and career

Early life

The Károlyi family were an illustrious, extremely wealthy, Roman Catholic aristocratic family who had played an important role in Hungarian society since the 17th century.
Mihály Károlyi was born on March 4, 1875, in the Károlyi Palace in the aristocratic palace district of Pest. Károlyi’s parents were cousins, and he was born with a cleft lip and cleft palate, which deeply determined his entire childhood and personality development. His mother died early from tuberculosis and his father soon remarried. His father considered Mihály unsuitable for a more serious career, because of his speech disorder. Due to his cleft lip and cleft palate, the young Mihály was often mocked and humiliated during his childhood by his cousins and other relatives of similar age, despite the power and wealth of his family, which influenced his subsequent vanity, ambition and desire for power.

Mihály was raised with great devotion in the castle of his grandmother at Fót, because his politician father, Count Julius Károlyi, had not enough time for Mihály. At the age of 14, his grandmother sent him to a Viennese clinic, where he underwent special surgery to restore his palate and mouth. This surgery proved to be a sharp turning point; for, after a couple of weeks of recovery, Mihály started to speak quickly, fluently and very elaborately, despite the fact that the family and relatives formerly thought that he was too dumb to speak. His severe developmental disorder was a decisive factor in the development of Karolyi's personality. His struggle to learn to speak and to live a full life after his cleft palate surgery sapped his willpower. As an adult, "iron will, ambition, stubbornness and the security of his immense wealth drove him on his political career." Throughout his life, he has learned three foreign languages at almost native level: English, German and French. His mindset and character were shaped by external influences: including hatred towards the Habsburg dynasty, the traditional anti-German sentiment of his family, his foster father, the world-view of uncle Sándor Károlyi, his adoration of the 1848 revolution in Hungary, his idea of organizing peasants into farming cooperatives. Having unbroken optimistic faith in the rapid development of science and technology, which he thought would solve all problems of humankind, he developed an idealistic devotion to the cause of social justice based on his reading experiences, including the French Encyclopédie and Jules Verne novels. Although he was not interested in university lectures, he managed to pass his exams with the help of a tutor and obtained a law degree. At the age of 24, he became a unbridled adult. He wanted to make up for what he had missed as a teenager, throwing himself into the nightlife, with enthusiasm; he spent his time flagrantly, playing cards, having fun hunting. He lived in French spa towns, attended many international horse races and early automobile races in various European countries. Although his political opponents later sought to denounce his hedonistic lifestyle as a youth,<ref>"He spent lavishly. He gambled, sat in orgies. People laughed at him. No one took him seriously. His glamorous life and his passion for cards, and later his political activities, consumed vast sums of money. [...] He was surrounded by flatterers. And he believed what the profiteers bent over backwards to tell him." - This is how Cecile Tormay, who saw Karolyi closely as a contemporary, but who regarded him as a political opponent, and who deeply hated him, not without subjectivity, because of their shared social environment, remembers him in her diary. Tormay Cecile. Notes from 1918-1919 </ref> the truth is that Karolyi's youthful life was no different from that of aristocrats of his age. He loved travelling most of all, even going as far as the island of Ceylon, but he also travelled to almost every country in Europe and visited the USA four times. When he was at home, his favourite pastimes were horse riding, polo and hunting, but he also enjoyed playing cards and chess.

He was interested in all technical innovations: he enjoyed driving cars and became a passionate collector of race cars and yachts. On one occasion  a fellow pilot of Louis Blériot flew the plane to Hungary that had crossed the English Channel. Károlyi bargained with the pilot to board the famous plane and make a flight over Budapest. It was characteristic of the young Károlyi's recklessness that he sat on the frame of the one-seater airplane and clung to the iron bars, making his flight with legs hanging in the air. Being a Francophone, as was the tradition in his family, he spent several years in Paris; he also traveled across the United Kingdom and the United States. As a gambling addict, he was known for his card battles, his losses and for his "dandy" lifestyle in famous casinos across Western Europe.  Around the age of 30, the young tycoon starts to get serious and subsequently developed an interest in politics and public life.

 Early political career 

In his youth, he was a wastrel, but, as he grew older, he became devoted to more serious pursuits. In 1909, he became the President of the OMGE (National Agricultural Society), the main rural organization of the nobility. Initially a supporter of the existing political and social system in Hungary, Károlyi gradually became more progressive, leaning to left-wing orientation during his career.

He ran in the 1901 and 1905 and 1906 parliamentary elections in the lower house of parliament (House of Representatives) without success; however, as a count, he had a right to participate in the Upper house (House of Magnates) of parliament. In 1910, Károlyi was elected to Parliament as a member of the opposition Party of Independence, so he could participate in political life as a member of the House of representatives in parliament.

István Tisza and Mihály Károlyi became implacable political enemies following the 1905 elections. Their debates in parliament further increased their mutual personal antagonism with time. In January 1913, he was challenged to a duel by prime minister István Tisza, after refusing to shake Tisza's hand following a political disagreement. The 34-bout duel with cavalry sabres lasted an hour until Tisza cut Károlyi's arm and the seconds ended the duel.

 World War I, political campaign for the Allied Powers 
On August 5, when the war broke out, his ship arrived in Le Havre after returning from his long trip to the United States. He was promptly arrested, as a citizen of a belligerent country, despite the fact that Austria-Hungary was not yet at war with the French Republic. Consequently he was released from prison. Later, he was arrested again for several weeks in Bordeaux for being a citizen of a belligerent country. However, after promising that he wouldn't fight against the French during the war, he finally got a passport from the Bordeaux authorities. Afterwards he travelled to Genoa via Madrid and Barcelona and then returned home. On his way home to the Kingdom of Hungary, he crossed Italy at a time when Italy had not yet declared war on the Central powers and was therefore considered a neutral country.

During the First World War, the pro-Entente Károlyi led a small but very active pacifist anti-war maverick faction in the Hungarian parliament. In his parliamentary speeches he opposed the alliance of the Austro-Hungarian Monarchy and the German Empire: instead he advocated friendship between the peoples and argued against war and supported a pro-Entente foreign policy. Károlyi made contact with British and French Entente diplomats behind the scenes in Switzerland during the war. The Károlyi Party was always a weak group with no mass organization and only 20 members in Parliament, most of whom had little commitment to the party. Károlyi argued for peace with the Allies, loosing ties between Austria and Hungary, abolishing the property-based franchise requirements that allowed only 5.8% of the population to vote and run for office before the war, and giving women the right to vote and hold office. In particular, Károlyi demanded in 1915 that veterans should be granted the right to vote, which won so much popular support that it enraged Prime Minister, Count István Tisza.  In 1916 Károlyi broke off with his party, which had found his openly pro-Entente attitude to be too radical and dangerous for a war-time pacifist faction in parliament. Therefore, Károlyi formed a new party, called the United Party of Independence of 1848; generally known as the Károlyi Party.

In January 1918, Károlyi proclaimed himself a follower of Woodrow Wilson's Fourteen Points.

 Marriage and family 
On 7 November 1914 in Budapest, Károlyi married Countess Katalin Andrássy de Csíkszentkirály et Krasznahorka, with whom he had three children. As Károlyi's wife was a member of one of Hungary's most powerful families; by the marriage,  Károlyi got under the protection of his influential father-in-law.

Leading the Democratic Republic

Following the Aster Revolution of October 1918, Károlyi became leader of the nation. On 25 October 1918 Károlyi had formed the Hungarian  National Council. His reputation as an opponent of the much-hated war thrusted him into a role for which he was not suited. King-Emperor Charles IV designated him as prime minister as a part of a desperate attempt to hold Hungary on to the Habsburgs. Károlyi would have preferred to keep the monarchy and some link to Austria if possible. Only after Charles's withdrawal from government on 16 November 1918 made Károlyi proclaim the Hungarian Democratic Republic, with himself as provisional president. On 11 January 1919 the National Council formally recognized him as president.

Sigmund Freud, the Austrian psychologist—who had known the two politicians personally—wrote about the assassination of István Tisza and the appointment of Mihály Károlyi as new prime minister of Hungary:

In the same vein, the British writer Harold Nicolson, who had known Károlyi during his exile in Britain, when reviewing Károlyi's memoirs in 1957 noted that: 
Baron Lajos Hatvany described Károlyi's leadership well when he noted:

Károlyi's cabinet
(From 31 October 1918 to 19 January 1919)
Prime minister: Mihály Károlyi
Minister of Defense: Béla Linder (31 October 1918 to 9 November 1918); Albert Bartha (9 November 1918 to 12 December 1918; Mihály Károlyi (12 December 1918 to 29 December 1918; Sándor Festetics (29 December 1918 to 19 January 1919)
Minister of the Interior: Tivadar Batthyány (31 October 1918 to 12 December 1918; Vince Nagy (12 December 1918 to 19 January 1919)
Minister of Justice: Barna Buza (31 October 1918 to 3 November 1918; Dénes Berinkey (3 November 1918 to 19 January 1919)
King's Personal Minister: Tivadar Batthyány (31 October 1918 to 1 November 1918)
Minister of Agriculture: Barna Buza
Minister of Commerce: Ernő Garami
Minister of Finance:  Mihály Károlyi (31 October 1918 to 25 November 1918; Pál Szende (25 November 1918 to 19 January 1919)
Minister of Food:  Ferenc Nagy
Minister of Religion and Education: Márton Lovászy (31 October 1918 to 22 December 1918) Sándor Juhász Nagy (22 December 1918 to 19 January 1919)
Minister of Welfare and Labour: Zsigmond Kunfi (12 December 1918 to 19 January 1919)
Minister Without Portfolio: Oszkár Jászi (31 October 1918 to 1 November 1918); Zsigmond Kunfi (31 October 1918 to 12 November 1918); Béla Linder (9 November 1918 to 12 December 1918)
Minister Without Portfolio for Croatia-Slavonia and Dalmatia: Zsigmond Kunfi (6 November 1918 to 19 January 1919)
Minister Without Portfolio for Nationalities:  Oszkár Jászi (1 November 1918 to 19 January 1919)

Berinkey cabinet
(19 January 1919 to 21 march 1919)
On 19 January 1919, Károlyi resigned as Prime Minister to concentrate exclusively on his duties as President of the Republic. He appointed Dénes Berinkey to form the new government.

Prime minister: Dénes Berinkey
Minister of Foreign Affairs: (19 January 1919 to 24 January 1919); later Ferenc Harrer (24 January 1919 to 21 march 1919)
Minister of Defense: Vilmos Böhm (19 January 1919 to 21 march 1919)
Minister of the Interior: Vince Nagy (19 January 1919 to 21 march 1919)
Minister of Finance: Pál Szende (19 January 1919 to 21 march 1919)
Minister of Food: Ernő Baloghy (19 January 1919 to 21 march 1919)
Minister of Religion: János Vass (19 January 1919 to 21 march 1919)
Minister of Education: Zsigmond Kunfi (19 January 1919 to 21 march 1919)
Minister of Justice: Dénes Berinkey (19 January 1919 to 24 January 1919) later Sándor Nagy Juhász (24 January 1919 to 21 march 1919)
Minister of Commerce: Ernő Garami (19 January 1919 to 21 march 1919)
Minister of Welfare and Labour: Gyula Peidl  (19 January 1919 to 21 march 1919)
Minister for Rusyn minority: Oreszt Szabó (19 January 1919 to 21 march 1919)
Minister for German minority: János Junker (19 January 1919 to 21 march 1919)
Minister of Agrarian land reforms: István Szabó de Nagyatád (19 January 1919 to 21 march 1919)

Foreign policy

The Hungarian Royal Honvéd army still had more than 1,400,000 soldiers when Mihály Károlyi was designated as prime minister of Hungary. However, he took up the case of pacifism in accordance with U.S. President Woodrow Wilson's Fourteen Points by ordering the unilateral self-disarmament of the Hungarian army, leaving the country defenseless at a time of particular vulnerability. This happened on 2 November 1918, while Béla Linder served as minister of war Sharp A. The Versailles Settlement: Peacemaking after the First World War, 1919–1923. Palgrave Macmillan 2008. p. 156. . which made the occupation of Hungary directly possible for the relatively small armies of Romania, the Franco-Serbian army and the armed forces of the newly established Czechoslovakia.

Károlyi had appointed Oszkár Jászi as the new Minister for National Minorities of Hungary. During their brief periods in power, Oszkár Jászi, tried to create an "Eastern Switzerland" by persuading the non-Magyar peoples of Hungary to stay as part of the new Hungarian Republic. Jászi also immediately offered democratic referendums about the disputed borders to minorities, however, the political leaders of those minorities refused the very idea of democratic referendums at the Paris peace conference. Instead the Czech, Serbian, and Romanian political leaders chose to attack Hungary to seize territories. The military and political events changed rapidly and drastically after the Hungarian self-disarmament.

 on 5 November 1918, the Serbian army, with the help of the French army, crossed southern borders, 
 on 8 November, the Czechoslovak Army crossed the northern borders, 
 on 10 November d'Espérey's French-Serbian army crossed the Danube river and was poised to enter the Hungarian heartland, 
 on 11 November Germany signed an armistice with Allies, under which they had to immediately withdraw all German troops in Romania and in the Ottoman Empire, the Austro-Hungarian Empire and the Russian Empire back to German territory and Allies to have access to these countries.
 on 13 November, the Romanian army crossed the eastern borders of the Kingdom of Hungary.
 on 13 November, Károlyi signed the Armistice of Belgrade with the Allied Powers. It limited the size of the Hungarian army to six infantry and two cavalry divisions. Demarcation lines defining the territory to remain under Hungarian control were made, and
For their part, the neighboring countries used the so-called "struggle against communism", against the capitalist and liberal government of Count Mihály Károlyi.

During the rule of Károlyi's pacifist cabinet, Hungary lost control over approx. 75% of its former pre-WW1 territories (325 411 km2) without armed resistance and was subject to foreign occupation.

The lines would apply until definitive borders could be established. Under the terms of the armistice, Serbian and French troops advanced from the south, taking control of the Banat and Croatia. Czechoslovakia took control of Upper Hungary and Carpathian Ruthenia. Romanian forces were permitted to advance to the River Maros (Mureș). However, on 14 November, Serbia occupied Pécs.Breit J. Hungarian Revolutionary Movements of 1918–19 and the History of the Red War in Main Events of the Károlyi Era Budapest 1929. pp. 115–116.

Many citizens thought that Károlyi could negotiate soft peace terms with the Allies for Hungary. Károlyi headed the Provisional Government from 1 November 1918 until 16 November, when the Hungarian Democratic Republic was proclaimed.  Károlyi ruled Hungary through a National Council, transformed into the government that consisted of his party in alliance with the large Hungarian Social Democratic Party and the small Civic Radical Party led by Oszkár Jászi.

Additional trouble for the new government occurred over the question of the armistice. Austria-Hungary had signed the lenient Armistice of villa Giusti (close to Padua, Italy) with the Allies on 3 November 1918. Since Hungary was now independent, some in the Cabinet argued that Hungary needed to sign a new armistice. Against his better judgement, Károlyi agreed to this idea, and had Hungary sign in November 1918, a new armistice with the Allies in Belgrade with the Allied Commander in the Balkans, the French General Louis Franchet d'Esperey.

General Franchet d'Esperey treated the Hungarians with open contempt and imposed a much harsher armistice on the defeated nation than the Padua Armistice had. This was the source of much criticism of Károlyi, who had been expected – and who himself expected – the Allies to treat Hungary as a friend, not an enemy. Moreover, Károlyi's opponents argued that by needlessly seeking a second armistice, Károlyi had worsened Hungary's situation.

In another equally unfortunate move, the pacific-minded Károlyi had abolished almost all the Hungarian armed forces in November 1918. All through the winter of 1918–19, the Romanians, the Yugoslavs and the Czechoslovaks often broke the armistice in order to seize more territory for themselves. After January 1919, Károlyi ordered the build-up of a Hungarian army and started to consider the idea of an alliance with Soviet Russia, through Károlyi was opposed to the idea of Communism in Hungary itself.

In addition, as Hungary had signed an armistice, not a peace treaty, the Allied blockade continued until such time as a peace treaty was signed. Hungary had suffered from food shortages throughout the war and deaths from starvation had become common from 1917 onwards. Furthermore,  the country had been overwhelmed with refugees from Transylvania and Galicia.

Making things worse was the creation of Czechoslovakia which had cut Hungary off from supplies of German coal. Hungary which possessed little coal depended upon German coal imports. Without coal, most had to live without heat in the winter of 1918–19, and the railroad network had gradually ceased to function. The collapse of railroads in their turn caused the collapse of industry and hence mass unemployment.

Domestic politics

At the same time, there existed various revolutionary councils, which were dominated by the Social Democrats, which were not unlike the Soviets (Councils) that existed in Russia in 1917.  This situation of Dual Power gave Károlyi responsibility without much power while giving the Social Democrats power without much responsibility. The war deepened social differences and disparity, since the wealthy social strata not directly involved in the war could continue to live unchanged, i.e. carefree lives, and the wealth of the large entrepreneurs who supplied the war effort could even continue to grow enormously, while the wages of the workers who lived on wages were constantly and significantly devalued. Making things even worse was the economic incompetence of the new government which printed more and more money, leading to massive inflation and even more impoverishment. Károlyi's failure to improve living conditions or persuade the Allies to lift the blockade led to public criticism of Károlyi.

Of the more than forty laws and almost 400 decrees introduced by the Károlyi and Berinkey governments and passed by the National Council, the new electoral law gave the right to vote to all men over 21 and women over 24 who could read and write in any domestic language. General elections under the new law were scheduled for April 1919.

During the War, freedom of the press and freedom of assembly were temporarily banned on the grounds of wartime interests. Therefore, the Karolyi government reintroduced freedom of the press, freedom of association and freedom of assembly. With the economy on the verge of collapse as a result of the war, and with mass poverty and inflation, social reforms were introduced: unemployment benefit, tax arrears waivers, a ban on the employment of children under 14, wage increases, a token severance payment for demobilised soldiers, the introduction of an eight-hour working day and the extension of social security. Alongside the democratic establishment, the governments of the Karolyi regime also sought to consolidate internal order, but with little success. Furthermore, the Social Democrats who were Hungary's largest party by far, frequently undercut Károlyi and imposed their decisions on him without taking responsibility for their actions. Károlyi wished to transfer almost all of the rural lands to the peasants. To set an example, he gave all of his own vast family estates to his tenants. But this was the only land transfer that took place; the Social Democrats blocked any measures that might give the control of those lands to the peasantry on the grounds that it was promoting capitalism.  In February 1919, the government used police force against two recently formed extremist organisations: it dissolved the dictatorial right-wing government and the Hungarian National Defence League (MOVE) led by Gyula Gömbös, which demanded the armed defence of the historic (pre-World War I) Hungarian borders. After an unemployment demonstration on 20 February 1919, which led to an armed confrontation in front of the Budapest offices of the Népszava newspaper, he imprisoned thirty-two leaders of the Communist Party of Hungary, including their leader, Béla Kun.

Downfall of Károlyi government

On 20 March 1919 the French presented the Vix Note ordering Hungarian troops further back into Hungary; it was widely assumed that the military lines would be the new frontiers. Károlyi and Prime Minister Dénes Berinkey were now in an untenable position.  Although they did not want to accept this French demand, they were in no position to reject it either.  On 21 March, Berinkey resigned.  Károlyi then announced that only the Social Democrats could form a new government.  Unknown to Károlyi, however, the Social Democrats had merged their party with the Communists led by Béla Kun.  Hours after Berinkey resigned, the newly merged Hungarian Socialist Party announced Károlyi's resignation and the formation of the Hungarian Soviet Republic. The liberal president Károlyi was arrested by the new Communist government on the first day. He managed to make his escape and flee to Paris in July 1919.

Later life

On 10 April 1919, "Romanian troops began to invade Hungary to forestall reconquest of Transylvania.  A provisional government was set up by Count Julius Karolyi (brother of Michael), Count István Bethlen, Admiral Horthy, and Archduke Joseph at Szeged (under French occupation)."

In July 1919, Károlyi went into exile in France and during World War Two, in Britain. In August 1944, Károlyi, as president of the Hungarian Council in Great Britain, and his colleagues held a meeting to protest against the ongoing genocidal persecution of Hungarian Jews. Throughout the Horthy era, Károlyi was in a state of official disgrace in his homeland.

In 1924, while Károlyi's wife was in the United States she came down with typhoid fever. Károlyi applied for a visa to come to the United States to visit her, but the State Department imposed a gag order, preventing him from giving any political speeches, as the State Department believed him to be a Communist. A year later, Countess Károlyi was denied a visa to visit the United States, but Secretary Kellogg of the State Department refused to explain on what grounds her visa denial was made. Morris Ernst acted as Károlyi's lawyer for these issues.

In 1946, Károlyi, who by that time had become a socialist, returned to Hungary and from 1947 to 1949 served as the Hungarian Ambassador to France. In 1949, he resigned in protest over the show trial and execution of László Rajk.

He wrote two volumes of memoirs in exile; Egy egész világ ellen ("Against the Entire World") in 1925 and Memoirs: Faith without Illusion in 1954.

He died in Vence, France, on 19 March 1955 at the age of 80.

Legacy

During the socialist era of Hungary, Károlyi was praised as the founder of the first Hungarian republic. Many streets and other public places were named after him, and even a few statues were erected in his honor. The most famous one, sculpted by Imre Varga, was installed in Budapest's Kossuth Lajos tér in 1975. After the fall of communism his statue was repeatedly covered with red paint by unknown persons. At other times a wire was hung around his neck, a sign was hung on the wire with the inscription "I am responsible for Trianon".  The statue was dismantled at dawn on 29 March 2012, as part of the redevelopment of Kossuth Square, and transported to a foundry in Kőbánya, Finally Károlyi's statue was moved to Siófok at the residence of its creator. By the 21st century however, the view on him has become mixed at best. Many Hungarians blame him for the disintegration of Greater Hungary and for the establishment of the Hungarian Soviet Republic of 1919. At the same time, throughout Hungary, most cities also renamed their own streets named after him, sometimes in a creative way. In Budapest for example the name of the prominent street in downtown, was changed from "Károlyi Mihály utca" to simply "Károlyi utca", removing the association with him.

Footnotes

References and further reading
 Deak, Istvan. "Budapest and the Hungarian Revolutions of 1918-1919." Slavonic and East European Review 46.106 (1968): 129-140. online
Deak, Istvan "The Decline and Fall of Habsburg Hungary, 1914–18" pages 10–30 from Hungary in Revolution edited by Ivan Volgyes Lincoln: University of Nebraska Press, 1971.
 Hajdu, Tibor. "Michael Károlyi and the Revolutions of 1918–19." Acta Historica Academiae Scientiarum Hungaricae 10.3/4 (1964): 351-371. online
 Károlyi, Mihály. Fighting the World : The Struggle for Peace (New York: Albert & Charles Boni, 1925). 
 Károlyi, Mihály. Memoirs of Michael Karolyi: faith without illusion (London: J. Cape, 1956). online free to borrow
Menczer, Bela "Bela Kun and the Hungarian Revolution of 1919" pages 299–309 from History Today Volume XIX, Issue #5, May 1969, History Today Inc: London
Pastor, Peter, Hungary between Wilson and Lenin: the Hungarian revolution of 1918–1919 and the Big Three, Boulder: East European Quarterly; New York: distributed by Columbia University Press, 1976.
 Polanyi, Karl. "Count Michael Károlyi." Slavonic and East European Review (1946): 92-97. online
Szilassy, Sándor Revolutionary Hungary, 1918–1921, Astor Park. Fla., Danubian Press 1971.
 Vassady, Bela. "The" Homeland Cause" as Stimulant to Ethnic Unity: The Hungarian-American Response to Károlyi's 1914 American Tour." Journal of American Ethnic History 2.1 (1982): 39-64. online
Vermes, Gabor "The October Revolution In Hungary" pages 31–60 from Hungary in Revolution'' edited by Ivan Volgyes Lincoln: University of Nebraska Press, 1971.

External links

 

1875 births
1955 deaths
People from Pest County
Hungarian socialists
Presidents of Hungary
Prime Ministers of Hungary
Foreign ministers of Hungary
Finance ministers of Hungary
Mihaly Karolyi
Burials at Kerepesi Cemetery
Ambassadors of Hungary to France
Hungarian revolutionaries
Hungarian people of the Hungarian–Romanian War
Members of the National Assembly of Hungary (1945–1947)